Pseudomelatoma moesta is a species of small sea snail, a marine gastropod mollusk in the family Pseudomelatomidae.

Description
The length of the shell attains 30 mm, its diameter 10 mm.

The shell is dark brown under an olivaceous epidermis, with about ten curved longitudinal ribs, obsoletely nodulous on the periphery, with the whorls usually slightly constricted above it. The ribs are generally obsolete on the body whorl of adult specimens. The suture is narrowly corded, noduled and spotted. The aperture is chocolate within.

Distribution
This marine species occurs off California, USA.

References

 Carpenter, Journ. de Conchyl., ser. 3, vol. 12, p. 146, April, 1865.

External links
 

moesta
Gastropods described in 1864
Taxa named by Philip Pearsall Carpenter